Nyu Dam is an earthfill dam located in Gunma Prefecture in Japan. The dam is used for irrigation. The catchment area of the dam is 14.6 km2. The dam impounds about 23  ha of land when full and can store 1447 thousand cubic meters of water. The construction of the dam was started in 1936 and completed in 1952.

References

Dams in Gunma Prefecture